John Stone may refer to:

Politicians
John Stone (Parliamentarian) (before 1632 – after 1659), English politician
John Stone (MP for Wallingford) (before 1679 – after 1685), English politician 
John G. Stone (1876–1934), Newfoundland politician
John Hoskins Stone (1750–1804), American politician from Maryland
John Marshall Stone (1830–1900), American politician and governor of Mississippi, 1876–1882 and 1890–1896
Sir John Benjamin Stone (1838–1914), British Member of Parliament
John W. Stone (1838–1922), American politician and jurist from Michigan
John Young Stone (1843–1928), American politician from Iowa
John Stone (Australian politician) (born 1929), former Australian Senator and Treasury Secretary

Religious people
John Stone (chronicler) (died 1481), English monk and chronicler
John Stone (martyr) (died c. 1539), English martyr
John Stone (1765) (1765–1834), American church deacon
John Timothy Stone (1868–1954), American Presbyterian clergyman

Sportspeople
Stein Stone (James Nollner Stone Sr., 1882–1926), American football coach at Clemson University in 1908
John Stone (baseball) (1905–1955), American baseball outfielder
John Stone (curler) (born 1934), Welsh curler and coach
John Stone (footballer) (born 1953), English footballer
John Stone (American football) (born 1979), American football player
John Stone (athlete), English hurdler

Others
John Hurford Stone (1763–1818), British radical political reformer and publisher
John Augustus Stone (1801–1834), American dramatist and playwright

John Stone Stone (1869–1943), American mathematician, physicist and inventor
John Stone (producer) (1888–1961), American film producer and screenwriter
J. F. S. Stone (John Frederick Smerdon Stone, c. 1891–1957), British archaeologist
John Stone (actor) (1924–2007), Welsh actor
John A. Stone (died 1864), American collector and publisher of folk songs

Fiction 
John Stone (comics), character in DC Comics Planetary series

See also 
Sir John Stonor (judge) (1281–1354), English judge
John Stonor (bishop) (1678–1756), English Roman Catholic bishop
John Stones (born 1994), English footballer